First Interstate Center is a signature commercial office building located in the Transwestern Plaza, a complex consisting of four office towers with a total of 20 floors in the downtown core of Billings, Montana, United States. It is the tallest building in the northern Rockies, and the tallest in the state of Montana. It was built in 1985 and rises to 272 feet (83 meters). It is used primarily for office space.

Tenants
First Interstate BancSystem

See also
 First Interstate BancSystem
 List of tallest buildings in Billings
 List of tallest buildings by U.S. state

References

Further reading
 
 

Buildings and structures in Billings, Montana
Bank company headquarters in the United States

Office buildings completed in 1985
1985 establishments in Montana